Heinrich Gustav Schoch (1 January 1841 – 11 May 1895) was a Swiss politician and President of the Swiss Council of States (1888/1889).

Works

External links 
 
 

1841 births
1895 deaths
Members of the Council of States (Switzerland)
Presidents of the Council of States (Switzerland)